Humbug Park also previously known as Crossgates Greyhound Stadium is a football ground and former greyhound racing track on Inverkeithing Road in Crossgates, Fife, Scotland.

Origins
The name Humbug Park derives from a disused pit of the former Cuttlehill Colliery on which the ground is located.

Football
The ground is the home to Crossgates Primrose, a Scottish football club who play in the East of Scotland League.

Greyhound racing
Plans for a greyhound track were instigated in 1936 by the secretary of the football club. The racing distance was 275 yards and the racing took place regularly between 1937 until 1953. The track was independent (unlicensed) and took place on Friday and Saturday evenings and had a large mining community following.

References

Football venues in Scotland
Defunct greyhound racing venues in the United Kingdom
Greyhound racing in Scotland
Sports venues in Fife
Crossgates Primrose F.C.
1911 establishments in Scotland